Calmels is a French surname. Notable people with the surname include:

 Célestin Anatole Calmels (1822–1906), French sculptor
 Fabrice Calmels (born 1980), French ballet dancer
 François Calmels (born 1981), French golfer 
 Virginie Calmels (born 1971), French businesswoman and politician

French-language surnames